Egidio Colonna, O.S.B. or Carlo Colonna (1607 – 11 October 1686) was a Roman Catholic prelate who served as Titular Patriarch of Jerusalem (1671–1686) and Titular Archbishop of Amasea (1643–1671).

Biography
Egidio Colonna was born in 1607 and ordained a priest in the Order of Saint Benedict on 4 December 1638.
On 19 December 1643, he was appointed during the papacy of Pope Urban VIII as Titular Archbishop of Amasea.
On 19 January 1671, he was appointed during the papacy of Pope Clement X as Titular Patriarch of Jerusalem.
He served as Titular Patriarch of Jerusalem until his death on 11 October 1686.

Episcopal succession

References

External links and additional sources
 (for Chronology of Bishops)
 (for Chronology of Bishops)
 (for Chronology of Bishops) 
 (for Chronology of Bishops) 

17th-century Roman Catholic titular archbishops
Bishops appointed by Pope Urban VIII
Bishops appointed by Pope Clement X
1607 births
1686 deaths
Benedictine bishops